Cetirizine/pseudoephedrine (Zyrtec-D) is an antihistamine and decongestant formulation. It is a fixed-dose combination drug containing 5 mg cetirizine hydrochloride and 120 mg pseudoephedrine hydrochloride for symptoms related to seasonal allergic rhinitis. Cetirizine/pseudoephedrine gained approval from the U.S. Food and Drug Administration in 2001 as a prescription drug and became over-the-counter (OTC) in 2007.

References 

Antihistamines
Combination drugs